The 32d Combat Communications Squadron (32 CCS) was a United States Air Force combat communications squadron, located at Tinker AFB. They deploy quality communications-computer systems and air traffic services for military operations and emergency missions under hostile and base conditions anytime, anywhere.

Mission
Provide engineering team and expeditionary communications to support ADVON, initial reception of forces, and "reach forward" deployment of key personnel. Provide communications infrastructure to activate and robust two air expeditionary wings (AEW) with a maximum boots on ground of 3,000 persons each. Provide deployed base information infrastructure across the full spectrum of operations. Provide connectivity for base infrastructure and from base infrastructure to theatre information infrastructure. Provide power and environmental control where these services are not available from host or wing civil engineering. Provide theatre-level services including global broadcast system tactical receive suite, line of sight and intra-theatre information infrastructure. Provide air traffic control services to one AEW.

History
The 32nd Combat Communications Squadron was activated on 22 July 1988 under special order G-60 from Air Force Communications Command (AFCC). The 32nd Combat Communications Squadron has previously reported to the 552nd Air Control Wing stationed in Tinker Air Force Base, Oklahoma, the 602nd Air Control Wing stationed in Davis-Monthan Air Force Base in Tucson, Arizona, and the Tactical Communications Division headquartered at Langley Air Force Base, Virginia.

Assignments

Major Command
Air Combat Command (???- ???)

Wing/Group
 3d Combat Communications Group (???-Present)

Previous designations
 32d Combat Communications Squadron (???-Present)

Bases stationed
Tinker AFB, Oklahoma (???-Present)

Commanders
1988–1990 Major Alan Stemen

Decorations
Air Force Outstanding Unit Award

See also
3d Combat Communications Squadron

References

External links
Tinker AFB, Oklahoma
U.S. Air Force to Shut Down Award Winning Communications Unit at Tinker AFB news article

Combat Communications 0032
032